Mary J. Ruwart (born October 16, 1949) is an American retired biomedical researcher and a libertarian speaker, writer, and activist.  She was a leading candidate for the 2008 Libertarian Party presidential nomination and is the author of the book Healing Our World.

Early life, education, and medical career
Ruwart was born in Detroit, Michigan. She holds a Bachelor of Science with a major in biochemistry (1970), and a doctorate in biophysics (1974) from Michigan State University. After a 2½ year term on the faculty of the Department of Surgery at Saint Louis University School of Medicine, Ruwart spent 19 years as a pharmaceutical research scientist for Upjohn Pharmaceuticals, and has written extensively on the subjects of government regulation of the drug industry and on libertarian communication.

Libertarian activism and candidacies

A member of the Libertarian Party, Ruwart campaigned unsuccessfully for the party's presidential nomination in 1984 and for the vice-presidential nomination in 1992. Ruwart was the Libertarian Party of Texas's nominee for U.S. Senate in 2000, where she faced incumbent Republican Kay Bailey Hutchison; Ruwart polled 1.16% of the popular vote (72,798 votes), finishing fourth of four candidates behind Green Party candidate Douglas Sandage.

Ruwart has served on the Libertarian National Committee, and was a keynote speaker at the 2004 Libertarian National Convention. In 2002, libertarians launched an unsuccessful lobbying campaign to get Dr. Ruwart appointed Food and Drug Administration (FDA) Commissioner. Additionally, Ruwart has served on the boards of the International Society for Individual Liberty, the Fully Informed Jury Association, and the Michigan chapter of the Heartland Institute. Ruwart is a longtime supporter of the Free State Project and officially endorsed it on May 17, 2008 while on-air on Free Talk Live.

Ruwart unsuccessfully ran for Texas Comptroller in 2010 against incumbent Republican Susan Combs. She received 417,523 votes (10.5%) in a race that had no Democrat.

2008 presidential campaign

In March 2008, in response to an informal draft effort by a group of Libertarian Party activists, Ruwart announced her candidacy for the Libertarian presidential nomination in the 2008 election. She ran on a platform of ending military intervention overseas and nation-building, ending torture, ending foreign aid, promoting free trade, eliminating welfare entitlements and creating jobs by slashing government spending.

She lost the nomination to Bob Barr on the sixth ballot at the 2008 Libertarian National Convention on May 25, 2008. Despite tying with Barr on the third and fourth ballots and taking the lead on the fifth, she ultimately lost after third-placed candidate Wayne Allyn Root threw his support behind Barr. Root later received the vice-presidential nomination.

Bibliography

See also

 2008 Libertarian National Convention
 2012 Libertarian National Convention
 R. Lee Wrights

References

External links

 Ruwart's home page
 

1949 births
Living people
20th-century American non-fiction writers
20th-century American politicians
20th-century American women writers
20th-century American women politicians
21st-century American non-fiction writers
21st-century American politicians
21st-century American women writers
21st-century American women politicians
Candidates in the 1984 United States presidential election
1992 United States vice-presidential candidates
Candidates in the 2008 United States presidential election
Activists from Texas
American anarcho-capitalists
American women biochemists
American biophysicists
American political activists
American political writers
American women non-fiction writers
American drug policy reform activists
Female candidates for President of the United States
Female candidates for Vice President of the United States
Michigan State University alumni
Non-interventionism
Texas Libertarians
Writers from Detroit